Otto Kamillus Hugo Gabriel Count von Bray-Steinburg (* 17 May 1807 in Berlin – † 9 January 1899 in Munich) was a Bavarian diplomat and politician. He was a son of the diplomat Count François Gabriel von Bray, who was from Rouen, France.

Early life 
Bray-Steinburg came from the old Norman family of Bray. He was a son of the Bavarian diplomat Count François Gabriel von Bray (originally from Normandy) and Baroness Sophia Catherine von Löwenstern.
His main residence was the castle of Irlbach, south of Regensburg, but he also owned the nearby castles of Schambach and Steinburg.

Bray-Steinburg was taught in the Wilhelmsgymnasium in Munich and then studied law at the Universities of Göttingen and Munich.

Career 
He then served as a Bavarian diplomat in Vienna, Paris and Athens. In 1843 to 1859, Bray was, with interruptions, the Bavarian ambassador in Sankt Petersburg. In 1846 to 1847, and again in 1848 to 1849, he was the Bavarian foreign secretary. During his second term, he also served as President of the Council of Ministers, a title equivalent to prime minister. In 1859 to 1860, Bray was the Bavarian ambassador in Berlin, and he then returned to Vienna as ambassador.

In 1870, King Ludwig II. appointed Bray again Minister of State of the Exterior and Council president. In that position, Bray led the Bavarian delegation for the negotiations of the Bavarian accession to the German Empire and managed to secure a privileged status for the Kingdom of Bavaria within the empire (Reservatrechte). The Kingdom of Bavaria was able to retain its own railways, postal service, diplomatic body and even its own army, which would fall under Prussian command only during times of war.

In 1871, Bray resigned since he was in opposition to the Kulturkampf. He then served again as the German Empire's ambassador in Vienna until 1897.

He was awarded Serbian Order of the Cross of Takovo.

Marriage and children 

He married Donna Ippolita Emanuela Dentice di Frasso, from Naples, daughter of Prince Luigi VI Dentice di Frasso and Donna Anna Maria Serra. They had issue:

Countess Clara von Bray-Steinburg born 1848, married Count Ludwig von Lerchenfeld-Köfering in 1867.

Count Hippolyte von Bray-Steinburg born 1842, married Countess Anna von Medem in 1871.

Countess Gabriele von Bray-Steinburg born 1841, married Count Johann Douglas von Thurn-Valassina-Como Vencelli in 1863.

Countess Marie von Bray-Steinburg born 1839, married Count Giulio Figarolo di Gropello in 1858.

Orders and decorations
 :
 Grand Cross of the Royal Merit Order of Saint Michael, 1852
 Grand Cross of the Merit Order of the Bavarian Crown, 1861
 Knight of the Royal Order of Saint Hubert, 1871
 Cross of Honour of the Order of Ludwig, 1882
   Austria-Hungary:
 Grand Cross of the Imperial Order of Leopold, 1868
 Grand Cross of the Royal Hungarian Order of Saint Stephen, 1873
  Kingdom of Prussia:
 Knight of the Order of the Red Eagle, 1st Class, 28 April 1860
 Knight of the Royal Order of the Crown, 1st Class with Enamel Band of the Red Eagle Order, 28 January 1871
   Sweden-Norway: Commander Grand Cross of the Royal Order of the Polar Star, 24 May 1844

References

People from the Kingdom of Bavaria
Ministers-President of Bavaria
Members of the Bavarian Reichsrat
Members of the Bavarian Chamber of Deputies
Diplomats of Bavaria
1807 births
1899 deaths
Grand Crosses of the Order of Saint Stephen of Hungary
 
Commanders Grand Cross of the Order of the Polar Star